Jules Victor Génisson (24 February 1805 - 10 October 1860) was a Belgian painter, chiefly known for his architectural painting.

Biography
Born in Saint-Omer, in Northern France, in 1805, he studied at the Royal Academy of Fine Arts in Antwerp under Mattheus Ignatius van Bree. He travelled extensively throughout Western Europe, painting large sized church interiors. He was a teacher of Joseph Maswiens and of his own son Georges-Paul Génisson.

He died in Bruges in 1860.

Notes

1805 births
1860 deaths
People from Saint-Omer
19th-century Belgian painters
19th-century Belgian male artists